The Niobrara River Bridge is a triple-span railroad bridge over the Niobrara River in Niobrara State Park, Knox County, Nebraska, that was built in 1929.

It was listed on the National Register of Historic Places in 1992.

It is one of few multi-span railroad bridges in Nebraska.

See also
 
 
 
 List of bridges on the National Register of Historic Places in Nebraska
 National Register of Historic Places listings in Knox County, Nebraska

References

External links

Bridges on the National Register of Historic Places in Nebraska
Bridges completed in 1929
Buildings and structures in Knox County, Nebraska
Railroad bridges in Nebraska
Transportation in Knox County, Nebraska
Warren truss bridges in the United States